Black Water: Abyss is a 2020 Australian horror thriller film directed by Andrew Traucki. It is a standalone sequel to Black Water (2007). In the film, a group of friends venture in deep forests of Australia to explore a remote cave system. However, when a tropical storm hits and rising flood waters trap them deep below the surface, something even deadlier emerges from the darkness—a large killer crocodile. It was released on July 10, 2020.

Plot
Two Japanese tourists gets lost in the forest of Australia and fall into a remote cave, where they are ambushed and killed by an unknown creature.

Five enthusiast explorers; Cash (Anthony Sharpe), Eric (Luke Mitchell) Jen (Jessica McNamee), Victor (Benjamin Hoetjes) and Yolanda (Amali Golden) go to check out the cave that Cash previously discovered. Cash brushes off a storm warning from the weather app and they continue on into the cave. They follow a tunnel down to an open lake. Unbeknownst to the group it begins to rain and the cave begins to flood, soon the path they came in is now submerged underwater. They begin to look for a way out but are unaware of the presence of the creature that killed the two Japanese tourists. Victor sees something in the water and leaves the group to retrieve it. He is attacked by the creature that is revealed to be a massive saltwater crocodile, but survives with critical injures. Cash and Eric leave to look for an exit while the others stay behind. Swimming back underwater to the tunnel that they came through, they reach the exit and find it is blocked with rocks. They then decide to go back and look for another way.

Back in the cave, Victor starts having a severe asthma attack, forcing Yolanda to get in the water to give him his inhaler where she has a close encounter with the beast. Eric's foot gets trapped between some rocks and nearly drowns while Cash makes it back to the first tunnel, but is soon attacked by the beast and killed. Eric reaches the tunnel only to see Cash's headlight in the water. He returns to the group and informs them of Cash's death. Jen notices a breeze and goes to investigate, finding a previously unseen passage in the cave. Yolanda tells Victor that she is pregnant. The water continues to rise bringing the beast closer to the group. Yolanda volunteers to go through the new tunnel to find a way out with Eric assisting her. On the way, she tells Eric that she is pregnant and reveals that the baby is in fact his, and not Victor's.

The water back in the cave starts rising fast, forcing Jen and Victor to try and get to higher ground even though it means going in the water. They make it to a ledge but the beast attacks forcing them to go higher. Yolanda and Eric fail to find an exit through the new tunnel which is blocked by rocks and return to the group. Jen looks through Yolanda's camera and finds pictures of Eric and Yolanda on a night out. She sees a picture of the two looking lovingly at each other and gets upset. She leaves Victor on the high ledge to get something in the water but she cannot reach it. She decides to get into the water to get it. The beast starts swimming towards her. She panics and in her rush to get out of the water, she slips and knocks herself unconscious. Victor leaves his ledge to help her. The beast leaps out of the water and drags Victor in, killing him. Jen races back up to the high ledge and cries. She spots a light under the water just as Eric and Yolanda return to the cave. Jen has to tell Yolanda that Victor has been killed.

Jen confronts Eric and Yolanda about their affair. Eric and Yolanda tell her that it wasn't an affair, rather a mistake. They also confirm that the baby is Eric's and not Victor's. Once again, Jen notices the light and Eric realizes that water is getting sucked out through a tunnel and he believes it leads outside. Yolanda doesn't want to go, but Jen says she would rather take her chances than sit there and wait to die. This convinces Yolanda to go. They all get in the water and swim for the tunnel. The beast starts swimming towards them. Eric splashes the water to distract the beast while the girls escape. The beast grabs Eric and kills him. Swimming through the cave, Jen almost runs out of air but Yolanda grabs her arm and pulls her to safety. They follow the tunnel and find that they are outside by the shore. They climb up a hill and come to the road and find the car they came in. Yolanda tries to apologise to Jen but she doesn't want to hear it.

The girls drive down the road but a fallen tree forces Jen to swerve straight into the river and begins to sink. When they realize they are in the same water they came out of, the beast reappears and starts attacking the side of the car. Both girls make it out of the car and swim to shore but Yolanda can't swim quickly due to an ankle injury. Jen makes it to shore and turns to see Yolanda being stalked by the beast. She starts shooting at it, but the beast leaps out of the water and grabs her, dragging her under. Jen manages to escape and it is revealed that she killed the beast. They embrace and get out of the water to go home.

Cast
 Jessica McNamee as Jennifer
 Luke Mitchell as Eric
 Amali Golden as Yolanda
 Benjamin Hoetjes as Victor
 Anthony J. Sharpe as Cash

Production
Black Water: Abyss was directed by Andrew Traucki, written by John Ridley and Sarah Smith and produced by Neal Kingston, Michael Robertson and Pam Collis with executive producers Jack Christian and Christopher Figg, and a standalone sequel to Black Water (2007).

It was a Screen Media release of a Piccadilly Pictures presentation, made in association with SQN, Screen Queensland, Altitude Film Entertainment, of a Thrills & Spills production.

Release
The film was released in Australian cinemas on 10 July 2020, Australian distribution was through R & R Films, while international distribution was handled by Altitude.

Reception
Reviews were generally less than glowing, although one reviewer praised its "effective, admirable simplicity", saying "When it's not digging into thin relationship drama, it maintains a confident, claustrophobic nihilism", and another calling it "decently scary".

References

External links

Australian horror films
2020 horror thriller films
2020s survival films
Films about crocodilians
Australian action horror films
Films shot in Australia
2020 films
2020s English-language films
Films directed by Andrew Traucki